Akta-Vite is a brand of chocolate flavouring for milk or plant milk. As it does not itself contain milk products, it is lactose-free and suitable for people who are lactose intolerant or avoiding dairy products for other reasons. It was created in 1943 by George Nicholas in Chadstone, a suburb of Melbourne, and initially marketed as a nutritional supplement available only in pharmacies. It is owned and manufactured by the Nicholas family through Nicholas Health and Nutrition Pty Ltd.

History
Alfred Nicholas and his brother George Nicholas became wealthy by producing Australian-made aspirin sold as Aspro after Bayer lost their Australian patent during the First World War. This wealth enabled them to diversify into nutritional supplements, including Akta-Vite. Many nutrients were not readily available in synthetic form in the 1940s, with natural ingredients including vitamin A from shark livers. Akta-Vite was exported to Southeast Asia in the 1950s, and became a well-known brand in Thailand.

The brand was sold to the Sara Lee Corporation in 1984, and bought back by the Nicholas family in 2016.

Marketing
The product is recognisable by its orange tin can.

References

External links 
 

Chocolate drinks
Drink brands
Products introduced in 1943
Hot drinks
Australian cuisine
Australian brands
Australian companies established in 1943
Drink companies of Australia